I, Madman (retitled Hardcover in the UK, Europe and Japan) is a 1989 American horror film directed by Tibor Takács.

Plot

Second-hand bookstore clerk Virginia Clayton (Jenny Wright) becomes absorbed in the book ‘I, Madman’ by Malcolm Brand (Randall William Cook). In the book, the deranged, deformed Dr. Kessler is obsessed with beautiful actress Anna Templar and kills victims, sewing part of each victim’s face onto his own. But as Virginia continues to read, someone starts to emulate the killings in the book, targeting the people around her.

Cast
Jenny Wright ... Virginia
Clayton Rohner ... Richard
Randall William Cook ... Dr. Alan Kessler/ Malcolm Brand
Stephanie Hodge ... Mona
Michelle Jordan ... Colette
Vance Valencia ... Sgt. Navarro
Mary Baldwin ... Librarian
Raf Nazario ... Lyle, Hotel Clerk (as Rafael Nazario)
Bob Frank ... Hotel Manager
Bruce Wagner ... Pianist

Release 
The film premiered in April 1989 and was released theatrically in the United States on October 13, 1989. Media Home Entertainment released it to home video in 1990. MGM released a full frame DVD of the film on August 26, 2003. Scream Factory released the film for the first time on Blu-ray on July 21, 2015.

Awards

References

External links
 
 

1989 horror films
1980s English-language films
American slasher films
1989 films
1980s slasher films
Films scored by Michael Hoenig
Films directed by Tibor Takács
1980s American films